The Battle of Lippa was an engagement which took place on 13 September 1813 in the French Illyrian provinces between the Napoleonic Italian and Austrian forces.

Battle
After the lost Battle of Lippa and several rumors Italian viceroy Eugene had to change plans and ordered an attack from Ljubljana on the Austrian position near Šmarje-Sap for September 13. However, the outnumbered Austrians were in a strong position and managed to hold all Italian attacks, finally repulsing them.

References

Sources

Battles of the War of the Sixth Coalition
Battles of the Napoleonic Wars
Battles involving Austria
Battles involving France
Battles involving Italy
Conflicts in 1813
September 1813 events
1813 in the Austrian Empire